Buenavista, officially the Municipality of Buenavista, is a 2nd class municipality and the largest settlement in the province of Guimaras, Philippines. According to the 2020 census, it has a population of 52,899 people.

The town acts as a cheaper link between Panay and Negros, as opposed to taking a ship directly between the two islands.

Buenavista is a part of the Metro Iloilo–Guimaras area, centered on Iloilo City.

History

Buenavista is the oldest municipality on Guimaras. It was established in 1775, during the Spanish colonial period. A Spanish governor general was reputedly impressed by the scenery of the location, and called the place Buenavista, Spanish for "beautiful view".

Santo Rosario was formerly known as Baybay, while Salvacion's old name was Ambulong, and furthermore Old Poblacion's name was Daan Banwa.

Geography
Buenavista is located at the northern tip of Guimaras Island, and is one of the five towns comprising the province of Guimaras. The northern and north-west part of the town overlooks Panay Island and the north-east portion faces Negros Island. Iloilo Strait lies between the town and Panay, and Guimaras Strait lies between the town and Negros. MacArthur's Wharf serves as the municipal wharf for Buenavista and part of San Lorenzo is used by passengers from the neighboring Panay Island in going to Negros Province and vice versa. This transportation route serves as a cheaper link, rather than taking a ship.

Buenavista's terrain ranges from plains (nearly level in the central and north-west coastal areas) to mountains (north-western part).

Climate

The climate is mild and cool, due to its being bounded by the sea on the three directions.

Barangays
Buenavista is politically subdivided into 36 barangays.

 Agsanayan
 Avila
 Banban
 Bacjao (Calumingan)
 Cansilayan
 Dagsaan
 Daragan
 East Valencia (Mantangingi)
 Getulio (Ili)
 Mabini
 Magsaysay
 McLain
 Montpiller
 Navalas
 Nazaret
 New Poblacion (Calingao)
 Old Poblacion (Daan Banwa)
 Piña
 Rizal
 Salvacion (Ambulong)
 San Fernando
 San Isidro
 San Miguel
 San Nicolas (Tabao)
 San Pedro (Bating)
 San Roque
 Santo Rosario 
 Sawang
 Supang
 Tacay
 Taminla(Sambag)
 Tanag
 Tastasan
 Tinadtaran
 Umilig
 Zaldivar

Demographics

Economy

Transportation

There are passenger ferries, utilizing pump boats to Iloilo City.  The ferry terminal in Iloilo is on the Iloilo River.

Education
Buenavista is the center of higher education. In fact, the main campus of Guimaras State University, only state university in Guimaras, is found in Barangay Mclain. Furthermore, the municipality has 19 public elementary schools, 5 public high schools, and 1 vocational technical school. It has a literacy rate of 98.4%, the highest in the whole of Guimaras.

References

External links

 [ Philippine Standard Geographic Code]
Philippine Census Information

Municipalities of Guimaras